{|

{{Infobox ship characteristics
| Hide header = 
| Header caption = 
| Ship class = Light cruiser
| Ship displacement = 6,718 long-tons (standard); 7,400 long-tons (loaded)
| Ship length =* wl
 oa
| Ship beam = 
| Ship draft = 
| Ship propulsion = *4 × 665 psi boilers
2 geared steam turbines

| Ship speed = (design),  (trials)
| Ship range =  at 
| Ship complement = *As designed:
Officer: 35
Enlisted: 638;
Oakland class:
Officer: 47
Enlisted:766
| Ship sensors = *2x Mk37 GFCS
SC search radar
SG-1 surface-search radar
| Ship EW = 
| Ship armament = *As designed:
8 × dual 5"/38 caliber guns
4 × quad 1.1"/75 caliber guns
6 × single Oerlikon 20 mm cannons
2 × quad Mark 15 torpedo torpedo tubes
''Oakland class:
6 × dual 5"/38 caliber guns
8 × dual Bofors 40 mm guns
16 × single Oerlikon 20 mm cannons
2 × quad Mark 15 torpedo torpedo tubes
| Ship armor = *Belt: 
Deck: 
Turrets: 
Conning Tower: 
| Ship boats = 2-4 × lifeboats
| Ship notes = 
}}
|}

The Atlanta-class cruisers were eight United States Navy light cruisers which were designed as fast scout cruisers or flotilla leaders but which proved to be effective anti-aircraft cruisers during World War II. They were also known as the Atlanta-Oakland class'''. The Atlanta class originally had 16 x /38 caliber guns in eight two-gun turrets, arranged with three superfiring turrets forward, three more superfiring aft and two waist mounts, one port and one starboard, giving the first four Atlanta-class cruisers the heaviest anti-aircraft armament of any cruiser of World War II.

The Atlanta class saw heavy action during World War II, collectively earning 54 battle stars. The other six were decommissioned shortly after the war and were scrapped in the 1960s.

Specifications
As built, the original main gun battery of the first quartet of the Atlanta class was composed of eight dual /38 caliber gun mounts (8 × 2 5-inch guns). Fire control was by two Mk 37 fire control systems located on the centerline atop the superstructure. As built, these ships lacked radar but from the spring of 1942 they were re-fitted with FD (Mk 4) fire control radar and SC-1 and SG search radar. From 1943 the FD (Mk 4) radar was replaced by the improved Mk 12/Mk 22 combination.

The first four Atlanta class cruisers originally had a secondary anti-aircraft armament of twelve /75 caliber guns in three quad mountings, without directors fitted. By early 1942, as more weapons became available, a fourth quad mount had been installed on the quarterdeck and directors were fitted (probably Mk 44). By late 1942 these troublesome and relatively ineffective weapons began to be replaced in the surviving ships by twin mountings for the new and far superior Bofors 40 mm anti-aircraft guns with Mk 51 directors.

Also from early 1942, close-range AA armament was augmented by eight 20 mm rapid-fire anti-aircraft cannons in single Mk 4 mountings disposed two on the forward superstructure, four amidships between the funnels (displacing some of the ship's boats) and two on the quarterdeck aft. From 1943 onward, two more Mk 4 mountings were added on the forward superstructure and a pair on each side of the second funnel to counter the danger of Japanese air attacks. From the end of 1943, a quadruple 40 mm Bofors mounting replaced the twin mount on the quarterdeck, with the six depth charge projectors being removed as compensation.  The additions of radar, additional close-range anti-aircraft guns and other equipment seriously impaired the stability of these ships as the war progressed and resulted in overcrowding as more ratings had to be added to man them.

The second quartet of the Atlanta class, sometimes known as the Oakland class, was commissioned with only six twin 5-inch/38 mounts and with Bofors guns from the start, with four additional twin Bofors 40 mm mounts compared to their predecessors: two displacing the former 5-inch/38 wing turrets (improving both stability and close-range AA firepower while easing congestion) and two between the funnels displacing the previous two pairs of 20 mm Oerlikons. In addition the battery of 20 mm anti-aircraft cannons was increased with a pair on the bow, four on the forward superstructure, eight amidships arrayed on either side of the aft funnel and two on the quarterdeck aft for a total of sixteen.

The Atlanta-class cruisers were the only class of U.S. Navy cruisers commissioned during World War II to be armed with torpedo tubes, with eight  torpedo tubes in two quad launchers.

By the end of the war  had been given an anti-kamikaze upgrade which included replacing the four aft twin Bofors with quad mountings and greatly reducing the number of 20 mm mounts (to possibly as few as six) while replacing those that remained with twin rather than single guns. The torpedo tubes were removed.

Although ships of this class were planned as destroyer flotilla leaders, the original design did not include anti-submarine armament such as sonar or a depth charge battery. In early 1942, along with anti-aircraft and radar upgrades, these ships were fitted with sonar and the standard destroyer battery of six depth charge projectors and two stern mounted tracks. When the vessels were determined to be more valuable as protection against aircraft, the projectors were removed but the tracks were retained. The Oakland sub-class never received the projectors, getting only two stern tracks, probably due to marginal stability.

The ships were originally designed for 26 officers and 523 men, but this increased to 35 officers and 638 men with the first four ships, and 45 officers and 766 men with the second group of four ships beginning with Oakland. The ships were also designed as flagships with additional space for a flag officer and his staff but the additional space was used for additional crew necessary to man anti-aircraft weapons and electronics.

Criticisms
Although very formidable as anti-aircraft ships, the Atlanta-class cruisers did not fare well in combat. Of the three light cruisers lost by U.S. Navy during World War II, two were Atlantas. The only two cruisers of the class that engaged in surface combat were sunk: Atlanta and Juneau. Both of these vessels received their fatal blows from Japanese torpedoes, and gunfire from larger, more heavily armed ships. The unique armament of the Atlanta class did not contribute to their loss.

The Atlanta-class design was also criticized for its shortage of gunfire directors for the main 5-inch gun battery, which reduced its effectiveness. Initially there were not enough intermediate anti-aircraft guns (i.e. 1.1 in guns, Bofors 40 mm and the Oerlikon 20 mm rapid-fire cannons). These problems were somewhat corrected in naval shipyards by the end of 1942, but the Atlanta-class warships were thereafter overloaded with weight, compared to the size of their hulls. Throughout World War II and the postwar years, they had problems with topside weight; this was addressed by a redesign of the class which was then constructed as the three s.

Service history
All eight ships in this class served during World War II, and six ships survived the war. The lead ship of this class, was laid down on 22 April 1940 and launched on 6 September 1941. Atlanta was commissioned at the New York Navy Yard on 24 December 1941, just a few weeks after the Japanese attack on Pearl Harbor of 7 December. Atlanta participated as an anti-aircraft cruiser in the decisive American victory at the Battle of Midway in June 1942 before she was sent south to fight in the Solomon Islands.

After the war, the six surviving ships in this class were decommissioned between 1947 and 1949 and placed in the reserve fleet. The ships received a new type designation of CLAA in 1949. None of these ships were recommissioned to serve in an active role; all were ultimately struck and scrapped by 1970.

Ships in class

See also
The Cruiser-Destroyer and the CL-154 class cruiser, attempts to create a "super-Atlanta" by replacing the Atlantas 5-inch/38-caliber gun with the longer-range and faster firing 5-inch/54-caliber Mark 16 gun
, a contemporary British cruiser of similar size, role and configuration
List of cruisers of the United States Navy
List of ship classes of World War II

Footnotes

References

External links

Cruiser classes